Edward Ivo Medhurst Barrett,   (22 June 1879 – 10 July 1950) was an English Army officer, cricketer and rugby union international. A right-handed batsman who was considered one of the finest and hardest hitters of his day, he played first-class cricket for Hampshire, mainly between 1896 and 1912, with additional matches in 1920 and 1925.

Cricket career
Born on 22 June 1879 in Churt, Surrey, England, Barrett played his earliest cricket at Cheltenham College. He made his debut for Hampshire in 1896 against Warwickshire, and also played against Essex and Leicestershire the same year. He played more matches in 1897 and 1898 before serving in the Second Boer War between 1899 and 1902 though he did return for a handful of matches in 1901.

He returned to the Hampshire team in 1903, playing three matches that year, but by then his career with the police force was beginning to affect his availability for Hampshire, even more so when he was posted in the far east, where he played cricket for the Straits Settlements and Federated Malay States and was eventually made Commissioner of the Shanghai Municipal Police, where he played 14 matches for their cricket team over the years, his last coming as late as 1927.

In amongst his police career in the far east, he did still manage to play more for Hampshire, including a complete season in 1912, during which he also played for the Marylebone Cricket Club (MCC), the Gentlemen of England, the South of England and the Rest of England. Following that season, he did not play again for Hampshire in 1920, when he again played a full season, and returned for one final match against Worcestershire in 1925.

Rugby career
Barrett was injured during the war, though this did not stop him from appearing for the England national rugby union team in 1903, playing one match against Scotland in the Four Nations.

Military and disciplined service

After officer training at the Royal Military College, Sandhurst, Barrett was commissioned as a second lieutenant into the Lancashire Fusiliers on 11 February 1899. He served with the 2nd Battalion of his regiment in the Second Boer War 1899–1902, including as part of the Ladysmith Relief Force, and was slightly wounded at the engagement at Venters Spruit on 20 January 1900, when he had to take the responsibility as lieutenant, promotion to the rank later confirmed to the same day. The battalion stayed in South Africa throughout the war, which formally ended in June 1902 after the Peace of Vereeniging. Barrett joined other officers and men of the battalion who left Cape Town on the SS Britannic in October that year, and was stationed at Aldershot after their return. In 1903 he was promoted to captain, and in June 1903 was seconded as a Wing Officer to the Malay States Guides, a mostly Sikh regiment, stationed in Perak, in the Federated Malay States.

On 1 May 1907 he joined the Shanghai Municipal Police, as Assistant Superintendent of Police, heading the Sikh Branch for some years, before becoming Commissioner of Police in December 1925. On 1 October 1929 he was forced to resign after disputes about police effectiveness and reform. Barrett was appointed a Companion of the Order of the Indian Empire (CIE) in the 1919 Birthday Honours.

Barrett died 10 July 1950 in Boscombe, Bournemouth, in a bicycling accident.

References

External links
 Biography of Barrett (with photos)

1879 births
1950 deaths
Cricketers from Surrey
English cricketers
Federated Malay States cricketers
Straits Settlements cricketers
Hampshire cricketers
Marylebone Cricket Club cricketers
English rugby union players
England international rugby union players
People from Boscombe
North v South cricketers
Gentlemen of England cricketers
British Army personnel of the Second Boer War
Graduates of the Royal Military College, Sandhurst
Lancashire Fusiliers officers
Cycling road incident deaths
Road incident deaths in England
Rugby union players from Surrey
Rugby union centres